The name Dr. Nancy may also refer to Dr. Nancy E. Gary.

Dr. Nancy is a program on MSNBC hosted by Dr. Nancy Snyderman. It aired weekdays at noon Eastern Time. The show launched on June 29, 2009, as part of a sweeping revamp of MSNBC's daytime weekday programs along with Morning Meeting with Dylan Ratigan, a revamp of the channel's graphics, and its launch in high definition. Topics on the show generally related to health and/or politics. Monica Novotny served as breaking news anchor during the show.

On December 23, 2009, MSNBC announced that it cancelled the program due to low ratings. Its final broadcast aired on December 17, 2009.

References

External links
 

MSNBC original programming
2009 American television series debuts
2000s American television news shows
2009 American television series endings
2000s American medical television series
English-language television shows